An intercontinental ballistic missile (ICBM) is a ballistic missile with a range greater than , primarily designed for nuclear weapons delivery (delivering one or more thermonuclear warheads). Conventional, chemical, and biological weapons can also be delivered with varying effectiveness, but have never been deployed on ICBMs. Most modern designs support multiple independently targetable reentry vehicle (MIRVs), allowing a single missile to carry several warheads, each of which can strike a different target. Russia, the United States, China, France, India, the United Kingdom, Israel, and North Korea are the only countries known to have operational ICBMs.

Early ICBMs had limited precision, which made them suitable for use only against the largest targets, such as cities. They were seen as a "safe" basing option, one that would keep the deterrent force close to home where it would be difficult to attack. Attacks against military targets (especially hardened ones) still demanded the use of a more precise, manned bomber. Second- and third-generation designs (such as the LGM-118 Peacekeeper) dramatically improved accuracy to the point where even the smallest point targets can be successfully attacked.

ICBMs are differentiated by having greater range and speed than other ballistic missiles: intermediate-range ballistic missiles (IRBMs), medium-range ballistic missiles (MRBMs), short-range ballistic missiles (SRBMs) and tactical ballistic missiles (TBMs). Short and medium-range ballistic missiles are known collectively as the theatre ballistic missiles.

History

World War II 

The first practical design for an ICBM grew out of Nazi Germany's V-2 rocket program. The liquid-fueled V-2, designed by Wernher von Braun and his team, was widely used by Nazi Germany from mid-1944 until March 1945 to bomb British and Belgian cities, particularly Antwerp and London.

Under Projekt Amerika, von Braun's team developed the A9/10 ICBM, intended for use in bombing New York and other American cities. Initially intended to be guided by radio, it was changed to be a piloted craft after the failure of Operation Elster. The second stage of the A9/A10 rocket was tested a few times in January and February 1945.

After the war, the US executed Operation Paperclip, which took von Braun and hundreds of other leading German scientists to the United States to develop IRBMs, ICBMs, and launchers for the US Army.

This technology was predicted by US Army General Hap Arnold, who wrote in 1943:

Cold War 
After World War II, the Americans and the Soviets started rocket research programs based on the V-2 and other German wartime designs. Each branch of the US military started its own programs, leading to considerable duplication of effort. In the Soviet Union, rocket research was centrally organized although several teams worked on different designs.

In the Soviet Union, early development was focused on missiles able to attack European targets. That changed in 1953, when Sergei Korolyov was directed to start development of a true ICBM able to deliver newly developed hydrogen bombs. Given steady funding throughout, the R-7 developed with some speed. The first launch took place on 15 May 1957 and led to an unintended crash  from the site. The first strategic-missile unit became operational on 9 February 1959 at Plesetsk in north-west Russia.

It was the same R-7 launch vehicle that placed the first artificial satellite in space, Sputnik, on 4 October 1957. The first human spaceflight in history was accomplished on a derivative of R-7, Vostok, on 12 April 1961, by Soviet cosmonaut Yuri Gagarin. A heavily modernized version of the R-7 is still used as the launch vehicle for the Soviet/Russian Soyuz spacecraft, marking more than 60 years of operational history of Sergei Korolyov's original rocket design.

The US initiated ICBM research in 1946 with the RTV-A-2 Hiroc project. This was a three-stage effort with the ICBM development not starting until the third stage. However, funding was cut after only three partially successful launches in 1948 of the second stage design, used to test variations on the V-2 design. With overwhelming air superiority and truly intercontinental bombers, the newly forming US Air Force did not take the problem of ICBM development seriously. Things changed in 1953 with the Soviet testing of their first thermonuclear weapon, but it was not until 1954 that the Atlas missile program was given the highest national priority. The Atlas A first flew on 11 June 1957; the flight lasted only about 24 seconds before the rocket exploded. The first successful flight of an Atlas missile to full range occurred 28 November 1958. The first armed version of the Atlas, the Atlas D, was declared operational in January 1959 at Vandenberg, although it had not yet flown. The first test flight was carried out on 9 July 1959, and the missile was accepted for service on 1 September. The Titan I was another US multistage ICBM, with a successful launch February 5, 1959 with Titan I A3. Unlike the Atlas, the Titan I was a two-stage missile, rather than three. The Titan was larger, yet lighter, than the Atlas. Due to the improvements in engine technology and guidance systems the Titan I overtook the Atlas.

The R-7 and Atlas each required a large launch facility, making them vulnerable to attack, and could not be kept in a ready state. Failure rates were very high throughout the early years of ICBM technology. Human spaceflight programs (Vostok, Mercury, Voskhod, Gemini, etc.) served as a highly visible means of demonstrating confidence in reliability, with successes translating directly to national defense implications. The US was well behind the Soviets in the Space Race and so US President John F. Kennedy increased the stakes with the Apollo program, which used Saturn rocket technology that had been funded by President Dwight D. Eisenhower.

These early ICBMs also formed the basis of many space launch systems. Examples include R-7, Atlas, Redstone, Titan, and Proton, which was derived from the earlier ICBMs but never deployed as an ICBM. The Eisenhower administration supported the development of solid-fueled missiles such as the LGM-30 Minuteman, Polaris and Skybolt. Modern ICBMs tend to be smaller than their ancestors, due to increased accuracy and smaller and lighter warheads, and use solid fuels, making them less useful as orbital launch vehicles.

The Western view of the deployment of these systems was governed by the strategic theory of mutual assured destruction. In the 1950s and 1960s, development began on anti-ballistic missile systems by both the Americans and Soviets. Such systems were restricted by the 1972 Anti-Ballistic Missile Treaty. The first successful ABM test was conducted by the Soviets in 1961, which later deployed a fully operational system defending Moscow in the 1970s (see Moscow ABM system).

The 1972 SALT treaty froze the number of ICBM launchers of both the Americans and the Soviets at existing levels and allowed new submarine-based SLBM launchers only if an equal number of land-based ICBM launchers were dismantled. Subsequent talks, called SALT II, were held from 1972 to 1979 and actually reduced the number of nuclear warheads held by the US and Soviets. SALT II was never ratified by the US Senate, but its terms were honored by both sides until 1986, when the Reagan administration "withdrew" after it had accused the Soviets of violating the pact.

In the 1980s, President Ronald Reagan launched the Strategic Defense Initiative as well as the MX and Midgetman ICBM programs.

China developed a minimal independent nuclear deterrent entering its own cold war after an ideological split with the Soviet Union beginning in the early 1960s. After first testing a domestic built nuclear weapon in 1964, it went on to develop various warheads and missiles. Beginning in the early 1970s, the liquid fuelled DF-5 ICBM was developed and used as a satellite launch vehicle in 1975. The DF-5, with a range of —long enough to strike the Western United States and the Soviet Union—was silo deployed, with the first pair in service by 1981 and possibly twenty missiles in service by the late 1990s. China also deployed the JL-1 Medium-range ballistic missile with a reach of  aboard the ultimately unsuccessful type 92 submarine.

Post-Cold War 

In 1991, the United States and the Soviet Union agreed in the START I treaty to reduce their deployed ICBMs and attributed warheads.

, all five of the nations with permanent seats on the United Nations Security Council have fully operational long-range ballistic missile systems; Russia, the United States, and China also have land-based ICBMs (the US missiles are silo-based, while China and Russia have both silo and road-mobile (DF-31, RT-2PM2 Topol-M missiles).

Israel is believed to have deployed a road mobile nuclear ICBM, the Jericho III, which entered service in 2008; an upgraded version is in development.

On 15 December 2022, first night trial of Agni-V was successfully carried out by SFC from Abdul Kalam Island, Odisha. The missile is now 20 percent lighter because the use of composite materials rather than steel material. The range has been increased to 7,000 km.

By 2012 there was speculation by some intelligence agencies that North Korea is developing an ICBM. North Korea successfully put a satellite into space on 12 December 2012 using the  Unha-3 rocket. The United States claimed that the launch was in fact a way to test an ICBM. (See Timeline of first orbital launches by country.) In early July 2017, North Korea claimed for the first time to have tested successfully an ICBM capable of carrying a large thermonuclear warhead.

In July 2014, China announced the development of its newest generation of ICBM, the Dongfeng-41 (DF-41), which has a range of 12,000 kilometres (7,500 miles), capable of reaching the United States, and which analysts believe is capable of being outfitted with MIRV technology.

Most countries in the early stages of developing ICBMs have used liquid propellants, with the known exceptions being the Indian Agni-V, the planned but cancelled South African RSA-4 ICBM, and the now in service Israeli Jericho III.

The RS-28 Sarmat (Russian: РС-28 Сармат; NATO reporting name: SATAN 2), is a Russian liquid-fueled, MIRV-equipped, super-heavy thermonuclear armed intercontinental ballistic missile in development by the Makeyev Rocket Design Bureau from 2009, intended to replace the previous R-36 missile. Its large payload would allow for up to 10 heavy warheads or 15 lighter ones or up to 24 hypersonic glide vehicles Yu-74, or a combination of warheads and massive amounts of countermeasures designed to defeat anti-missile systems; it was announced by the Russian military as a response to the US Prompt Global Strike.

Flight phases 
The following flight phases can be distinguished:

ICBMs usually use the trajectory which optimizes range for a given amount of payload (the minimum-energy trajectory); an alternative is a depressed trajectory, which allows less payload, shorter flight time, and has a much lower apogee.

Modern ICBMs 

Modern ICBMs typically carry multiple independently targetable reentry vehicles (MIRVs), each of which carries a separate nuclear warhead, allowing a single missile to hit multiple targets. MIRV was an outgrowth of the rapidly shrinking size and weight of modern warheads and the Strategic Arms Limitation Treaties (SALT I and SALT II), which imposed limitations on the number of launch vehicles. It has also proved to be an "easy answer" to proposed deployments of anti-ballistic missile (ABM) systems: It is far less expensive to add more warheads to an existing missile system than to build an ABM system capable of shooting down the additional warheads; hence, most ABM system proposals have been judged to be impractical. The first operational ABM systems were deployed in the United States during the 1970s. The Safeguard ABM facility, located in North Dakota, was operational from 1975 to 1976. The Soviets deployed their ABM-1 Galosh system around Moscow in the 1970s, which remains in service. Israel deployed a national ABM system based on the Arrow missile in 1998, but it is mainly designed to intercept shorter-ranged theater ballistic missiles, not ICBMs. The Alaska-based United States national missile defense system attained initial operational capability in 2004.

ICBMs can be deployed from multiple platforms:
 in missile silos, which offer some protection from military attack (including, the designers hope, some protection from a nuclear first strike)
 on submarines: submarine-launched ballistic missiles (SLBMs); most or all SLBMs have the long range of ICBMs (as opposed to IRBMs)
 on heavy trucks; this applies to one version of the Topol which may be deployed from a self-propelled mobile launcher, capable of moving through roadless terrain, and launching a missile from any point along its route
 mobile launchers on rails; this applies, for example, to РТ-23УТТХ "Молодец" (RT-23UTTH "Molodets" – SS-24 "Scalpel")
The last three kinds are mobile and therefore hard to find.
During storage, one of the most important features of the missile is its serviceability. One of the key features of the first computer-controlled ICBM, the Minuteman missile, was that it could quickly and easily use its computer to test itself.

After launch, a booster pushes the missile and then falls away. Most modern boosters are Solid-propellant rocket motors, which can be stored easily for long periods of time. Early missiles used liquid-fueled rocket motors. Many liquid-fueled ICBMs could not be kept fueled at all times as the cryogenic fuel liquid oxygen boiled off and caused ice formation, and therefore fueling the rocket was necessary before launch. This procedure was a source of significant operational delay, and might allow the missiles to be destroyed by enemy counterparts before they could be used. To resolve this problem the United Kingdom invented the missile silo that protected the missile from a first strike and also hid fuelling operations underground.

Once the booster falls away, the remaining "bus" releases several warheads, each of which continues on its own unpowered ballistic trajectory, much like an artillery shell or cannonball. The warhead is encased in a cone-shaped reentry vehicle and is difficult to detect in this phase of flight as there is no rocket exhaust or other emissions to mark its position to defenders. The high speeds of the warheads make them difficult to intercept and allow for little warning, striking targets many thousands of kilometers away from the launch site (and due to the possible locations of the submarines: anywhere in the world) within approximately 30 minutes.

Many authorities say that missiles also release aluminized balloons, electronic noise-makers, and other items intended to confuse interception devices and radars.

As the nuclear warhead reenters the Earth's atmosphere its high speed causes compression of the air, leading to a dramatic rise in temperature which would destroy it if it were not shielded in some way. As a result, warhead components are contained within an aluminium honeycomb substructure, sheathed in a pyrolytic carbon-epoxy synthetic resin composite material heat shield. Warheads are also often radiation-hardened (to protect against nuclear armed ABMs or the nearby detonation of friendly warheads), one neutron-resistant material developed for this purpose in the UK is three-dimensional quartz phenolic.

Circular error probable is crucial, because halving the circular error probable decreases the needed warhead energy by a factor of four. Accuracy is limited by the accuracy of the navigation system and the available geodetic information.

Strategic missile systems are thought to use custom integrated circuits designed to calculate navigational differential equations thousands to millions of FLOPS in order to reduce navigational errors caused by calculation alone. These circuits are usually a network of binary addition circuits that continually recalculate the missile's position. The inputs to the navigation circuit are set by a general-purpose computer according to a navigational input schedule loaded into the missile before launch.

One particular weapon developed by the Soviet Unionthe Fractional Orbital Bombardment Systemhad a partial orbital trajectory, and unlike most ICBMs its target could not be deduced from its orbital flight path. It was decommissioned in compliance with arms control agreements, which address the maximum range of ICBMs and prohibit orbital or fractional-orbital weapons. However, according to reports, Russia is working on the new Sarmat ICBM which leverages Fractional Orbital Bombardment concepts to use a Southern polar approach instead of flying over the northern polar regions. Using that approach, it is theorized, avoids the American missile defense batteries in California and Alaska.

New development of ICBM technology are ICBMs able to carry hypersonic glide vehicles as a payload such as RS-28 Sarmat.

Specific ICBMs

Land-based ICBMs 

Russia, the United States, China, North Korea, India, and Israel are the only countries currently known to possess land-based ICBMs. 

The United States currently operates 405 ICBMs in three USAF bases. The only model deployed is LGM-30G Minuteman-III. All previous USAF Minuteman II missiles were destroyed in accordance with START II, and their launch silos have been sealed or sold to the public. The powerful MIRV-capable Peacekeeper missiles were phased out in 2005.

The Russian Strategic Rocket Forces have 286 ICBMs able to deliver 958 nuclear warheads: 46 silo-based R-36M2 (SS-18), 30 silo-based UR-100N (SS-19), 36 mobile RT-2PM "Topol" (SS-25), 60 silo-based RT-2UTTH "Topol M" (SS-27), 18 mobile RT-2UTTH "Topol M" (SS-27), 84 mobile RS-24 "Yars" (SS-29), and 12 silo-based RS-24 "Yars" (SS-29).

China has developed several long-range ICBMs, like the DF-31. The Dongfeng 5 or DF-5 is a 3-stage liquid fuel ICBM and has an estimated range of 13,000 kilometers. The DF-5 had its first flight in 1971 and was in operational service 10 years later. One of the downsides of the missile was that it took between 30 and 60 minutes to fuel. The Dong Feng 31 (a.k.a. CSS-10) is a medium-range, three-stage, solid-propellant intercontinental ballistic missile, and is a land-based variant of the submarine-launched JL-2.

The DF-41 deployed underground in Xinjiang, Qinghai, Gansu and Inner Mongolia. The mysterious underground subway ICBM carrier systems are called the "Underground Great Wall Project".

Israel is believed to have deployed a road mobile nuclear ICBM, the Jericho III, which entered service in 2008. It is possible for the missile to be equipped with a single  nuclear warhead or up to three MIRV warheads. In November 2011 Israel tested an ICBM believed to be an upgraded version of the Jericho III.

India has a series of ballistic missiles called Agni. Missile was test-fired for the second time on 15 September 2013. On 31 January 2015, India conducted a third successful test flight of the Agni-V from the Abdul Kalam Island facility. The test used a canisterised version of the missile, mounted over a Tata truck. On 15 December 2022, first night trial of Agni-V was successfully carried out by SFC from Abdul Kalam Island, Odisha. The missile is now 20 percent lighter because the use of composite materials rather than steel material. The range has been increased to 7,000 km.

Submarine-launched ICBMs

Missile defense 

An anti-ballistic missile is a missile which can be deployed to counter an incoming nuclear or non-nuclear ICBM. ICBMs can be intercepted in three regions of their trajectory: boost phase, mid-course phase or terminal phase. The United States, Russia, India, France, Israel, and China have now developed anti-ballistic missile systems, of which the Russian A-135 anti-ballistic missile system, the American Ground-Based Midcourse Defense and the Indian Prithvi Defence Vehicle Mark-II are the only systems having the capability to intercept and shoot down ICBMs carrying nuclear, chemical, biological, or conventional warheads.

See also 
 Bernard Schriever
 DEFCON
 Dense Pack
 Emergency Action Message
 High-alert nuclear weapon
 ICBM address
 List of states with nuclear weapons
 Nuclear disarmament
 Nuclear navy
 Nuclear warfare
 Submarine
 Throw-weight
 Universal Rocket

References

Further reading 
 J. K. Golovanov, M., "Korolev: Facts and myths", Nauka, 1994, .
 "Rockets and people" – B. E. Chertok, M: "mechanical engineering", 1999.  .
 "Testing of rocket and space technology – the business of my life" Events and facts – A.I. Ostashev, Korolyov, 2001. Bibliography 1996–2004
 "Nesterenko" series Lives of great people – Authors: Gregory Sukhina A., Ivkin, Vladimir Ivanovich, publishing house "Young guard" in 2015, .

External links 
Missile Threat A Project of the Center for Strategic and International Studies

 

Missiles
Soviet inventions